Kurtis Marschall (born 25 April 1997) is an Australian pole vaulter. He qualified for the 2020 Tokyo Olympics. In his Men's pole vault Group he came 2nd with a leap of 5.75m which qualified him for the final. In the final he did not register a clearance after dislodging the bar with all 3 attempts at his opening height of 5.55m.

Early years 
Marschall was born on 25 April 1997 in North Adelaide, South Australia.

In 2008, as an 11-year-old, Marschall was inspired by Steve Hooker's gold medal win at the Olympic Games in Beijing. A year later he attended a ‘come-and-try' day in Adelaide where he jumped two metres.

Marschall started training with Alan Launder and 4 years later was clearing five metres. Launder died in 2014 and Kym Simons coached him for the next few years. Not long after, Marschall made his international debut at the World U20 Championships.

Achievements 
in 2016 in Germany, ahead of his second World U20 Championships appearance, Marschall cleared 5.70 m, locking up Olympic qualification. It was the highest vault by a junior in the world for three years. He then competed at the 2016 Summer Olympics in Rio de Janeiro, in the men's pole vault.  He missed qualifying for the Olympic pole vault final on countback.

In 2017 he was 11th in the final at the World Championships. At the 2018 Gold Coast Commonwealth Games the following year he claimed gold for Australia. Marschall was now a 5.86m vaulter and top-5 in the Diamond Leagues. 

His personal best in the event is 5.91 metres set in Clermont-Ferrand, France in 2023, during the All Star Perche . 

At the 2022 Birmingham Commonwealth Games he claimed Gold for Australia with a winning jump of 5.70 metres.

International competitions

1No mark in the final

References

External links

1997 births
Living people
Australian male pole vaulters
Olympic athletes of Australia
Athletes (track and field) at the 2016 Summer Olympics
Athletes (track and field) at the 2018 Commonwealth Games
Athletes (track and field) at the 2022 Commonwealth Games
Athletes from Adelaide
Commonwealth Games medallists in athletics
Commonwealth Games gold medallists for Australia
Happy Valley Football Club players
Commonwealth Games gold medallists in athletics
Medallists at the 2018 Commonwealth Games
Medallists at the 2022 Commonwealth Games
Athletes (track and field) at the 2020 Summer Olympics
21st-century Australian people